Ciaran Lyons (born 13 December 1996) is an Australian stand up comedian, television and radio presenter.  He is best known for his work as a presenter on national radio network triple j as well as his television appearances on The Project, Talkin' 'Bout Your Generation and the latest series of SBS Filthy Rich and Homeless.

Personal life 
Lyons was born in Dublin, Ireland in 1996 where he lived for seven years before moving with his family to Perth, Australia.

Career 
Lyons did his first gig aged 14 years old at the Laugh Resort Comedy Club in Perth, and began performing at major comedy venues around Australia.  Whilst underage for the first few years of his career, his parents had to take him to all his shows.  In 2012 he appeared in the WA Raw Comedy Finals, before winning "Next Gen Comedian" the following year at the 2013 Perth International Comedy Festival.

At 18 years old, Lyons debut solo show at the Perth Fringe was nominated for "Best Comedy" award.  That same year he was selected to be part of the 2015 Melbourne International Comedy Festival "Comedy Zone" Show.  He has made appearances at Triple J's Good Az Friday, Splendour in the Grass and ABC Comedy Bites Gala (Hamer Hall, Melbourne).

Lyons was a regular Perth Metro Whip presenter for Network Ten's The Project, covering what was happening in Perth over the weekend.

In 2016 The Sunday Times included Lyons in their Hottest 100 WA People List.

Lyons now resides in Sydney and can be heard regularly presenting on national youth station Triple J.  Over the 2018 Summer he was heard filling in for weekday breakfast presenters Ben and Liam, hosting Triple J Breakfast.

Lyons has been heard hosting various shows across Triple J including weekday breakfast, lunch and Drive as well as across  the weekends on Breakfast and Afternoons.

He has opened for some of the biggest names in comedy including Ron Funches, Demetri Martin and Theo Von.

In 2019, Lyons was invited to headline a weekend of shows at Malaysia's largest comedy venue, The Joke Factory.

He is currently signed to Mushroom Group and Frontier Touring and recently appeared on Channel Nine's new series of Talkin' Bout Your Generation as part of the Gen Z team.

On 12 May 2020 it was announced that Lyons was one of the five high profile Australians in the new season of the SBS series Filthy Rich and Homeless.  Lyons experienced homelessness for ten days and it will be broadcast nationally over three episodes on SBS in June 2020.

Fundraising 
During the devastating 2019-20 Australian bushfire season Lyons produced, organised and hosted a Bushfire Relief Comedy Gala at The Astor Theatre in Perth to great success.  Featuring high profile names Peter Rowsthorn and Matt Dykinski, the night raised over $10,000 for Australian Red Cross.

References
Perth Comedian Ciaran Lyons suffers testicular torsion before Melbourne International Comedy Festival
The AU Interview: Comedians Jacob Lingard, Ciaran Lyons and Matt Stewart talk about "Comedy Zone" at MICF
STM Hotlist: Who are the faces to watch in 2016?
Mushroom Comedy Management - Ciaran Lyons
Splendour in the Grass 2016 Forum and Comedy Club lineup announced
Perth teen comic Ciaran Lyons lands triple j show.
Teen Comedian on the rise
Funny people fly in for Melbourne International Comedy Festival
Ciaran Lyons, Lawrence Mooney and Ben Darsow at Meeniyan: Hall full of laughs

External links
Official Website
Ciaran Lyons on Twitter
Ciaran Lyons on Instagram
Ciaran Lyons on Facebook

Australian stand-up comedians
Australian male comedians
1996 births
Living people